Vufflens-la-Ville railway station is a railway station in the municipality of Vufflens-la-Ville, in the Swiss canton of Vaud. It is an intermediate stop on multiple standard gauge lines of Swiss Federal Railways.

Services 
 the following services stop at Vufflens-la-Ville:

References

External links 
 
 

Railway stations in the canton of Vaud
Swiss Federal Railways stations